Fidel Antuña Batista (born 27 April 1972) is a Mexican politician from the National Action Party. From 2008 to 2009 he served as Deputy of the LX Legislature of the Mexican Congress representing Yucatán.

References

1972 births
Living people
Politicians from Yucatán (state)
People from Mérida, Yucatán
National Action Party (Mexico) politicians
21st-century Mexican politicians
Anahuac Mayab University alumni
Deputies of the LX Legislature of Mexico
Members of the Chamber of Deputies (Mexico) for Yucatán